CFPS is an abbreviation which can refer to:
 Cell-free protein synthesis
 Certified Fire Protection Specialist
 China Family Panel Studies
 cubic foot per second - cubic foot flow rate
 CFPS-FM